William Paul O'Connor (29 September 1910 – 18 September 1987) was an Australian politician. He was educated at Catholic schools before becoming a clerk, as well as an organiser of the Australian Workers' Union.

In 1946, he was elected to the Australian House of Representatives as the Labor member for West Sydney. Following that election, one of the defeated candidates for the seat, Ronald Sarina, petitioned the High Court to declare O'Connor's election void, claiming that O'Connor's adherence to the Roman Catholic faith represented allegiance to a foreign power, which would make him ineligible to be a member of parliament under Section 44 of the Constitution of Australia. Sarina's solicitor sought leave to withdraw the petition, which was granted.

Following the redistribution of 1949, O'Connor transferred to Martin, which he held until 1955. In that year, Martin was abolished, and O'Connor defeated sitting Labor MP Arthur Greenup for preselection for the seat of Dalley. O'Connor held Dalley until its abolition in 1969, at which time he retired.

He died in 1987, 11 days before his 77th birthday.

References

Australian people of Irish descent
Australian Labor Party members of the Parliament of Australia
Members of the Australian House of Representatives for West Sydney
Members of the Australian House of Representatives for Martin
Members of the Australian House of Representatives for Dalley
Members of the Australian House of Representatives
1910 births
1987 deaths
20th-century Australian politicians